Joseph Birchard (February 1673 – March 9, 1755) was a member of the Connecticut House of Representatives from Norwalk, Connecticut Colony in the sessions of May 1730 and May 1734.

He was the son of John Birchard, a founding settler and town clerk of Norwich and Christian Andrews.

On December 15, 1709, he, along with Thomas Betts, John Betts, and John Gregory, Jr., was authorized by a town meeting to dam a creek for the purposes of building a grist mill.

References 

1673 births
1755 deaths
Members of the Connecticut House of Representatives
Politicians from Norwalk, Connecticut
Politicians from Norwich, Connecticut
People from Wilton, Connecticut